Pan Feihong (Simplified Chinese:, born 17 July 1989) is a Chinese rower from Rui'an. She represented her country at the 2016 Summer Olympics, where she won the bronze medal in the lightweight double sculls event.

References 

1989 births
Living people
Chinese female rowers
Rowers at the 2016 Summer Olympics
Olympic rowers of China
Olympic bronze medalists for China
Rowers from Zhejiang
People from Rui'an
Olympic medalists in rowing
Medalists at the 2016 Summer Olympics
Asian Games medalists in rowing
Rowers at the 2010 Asian Games
Asian Games gold medalists for China
Medalists at the 2010 Asian Games
21st-century Chinese women